Darrel J. McLeod is a Cree writer from Canada. His memoir Mamaskatch: A Cree Coming of Age, an account of his childhood struggles with physical and sexual abuse, won the Governor General's Award for English-language non-fiction at the 2018 Governor General's Awards and was a shortlisted finalist for the 2019 RBC Taylor Prize.

Originally from Treaty 8 Cree territory near Smith, Alberta, McLeod went on to work as a teacher, a health care worker, a land claims negotiator and as director of education and international affairs for the Assembly of First Nations. He began writing the book while studying creative writing under Betsy Warland at Simon Fraser University.

The book also touches both on McLeod's coming out as a gay man, and on his sibling's transition as transgender.

His second book, Peyakow, was shortlisted for the 2021 Hilary Weston Writers' Trust Prize for Nonfiction.

References

21st-century Canadian non-fiction writers
21st-century Canadian male writers
21st-century First Nations writers
Canadian memoirists
Cree people
LGBT First Nations people
Canadian gay writers
Writers from Alberta
Writers from British Columbia
Living people
Governor General's Award-winning non-fiction writers
Canadian male non-fiction writers
Gay memoirists
Year of birth missing (living people)
21st-century memoirists
21st-century Canadian LGBT people